John H. Rice was an American football coach, college administrator, and professor. He served as the athletic director and head football coach at Alma College in 1897.

Early life and education
Rice attended Lake Forest University, and graduated in 1895 with a Bachelor of Arts degree. He then pursued postgraduate studies at the University of Wisconsin, where he played on the varsity football and baseball teams. He graduated from Wisconsin in 1896.

Administrative and coaching career
In 1897, Alma College in Alma, Michigan hired Rice as its director of athletics and to handle coaching duties. At Alma, he also served as a professor of physical training, rhetoric, and general history. Rice coached the football team during the 1897 season. Before the season, the Detroit Free Press wrote that it "expected Alma's good record will be continued" under Rice. The team amassed a record of 4–2. Rice left Alma after the 1897–98 academic year.

Head coaching record

References

Year of birth missing
Year of death missing
19th-century players of American football
Alma Scots athletic directors
Alma Scots football coaches
Alma College faculty
Lake Forest College alumni
Wisconsin Badgers baseball players
Wisconsin Badgers football players